St. Catherine's Church, Pärnu is a Russian Orthodox church in Pärnu, Estonia.

The church was built in 1764-1768 and named after the empress, Catherine the Great, who presented the church to the city after a visit in 1764. It is built in a baroque style by architect P. Jegorov, and has been a source of inspiration for subsequent orthodox church architecture in the Baltic states. It displays a large central dome with a lantern, flanked by four smaller turrets and a western tower with a needle-pointed spire. The façade is rather lavishly decorated, divided by pediments and cornices. Inside, the iconostasis, also by Jegorov, is noteworthy.

References

Buildings and structures in Pärnu
18th-century Eastern Orthodox church buildings
18th-century establishments in Estonia
Baroque architecture in Estonia
Russians in Estonia
Tourist attractions in Pärnu County
1768 establishments in the Russian Empire
Eastern Orthodox churches in Estonia